Naval Intelligence Division or Department of Naval Intelligence may refer to:

Naval Intelligence Division (United Kingdom), 1912–1964
Naval Intelligence Division (Israel)
Naval Intelligence (Pakistan)
Office of Naval Intelligence, of the United States Navy
Director of Naval Intelligence, U.S. Navy
Directorate of Naval Intelligence (India)
German Naval Intelligence Service

See also

Defense intelligence (disambiguation)
Military intelligence